Inkaar is a 1977 Hindi thriller film, produced by Romu N. Sippy and directed by Raj N. Sippy. the film stars Vinod Khanna, Vidya Sinha, Amjad Khan and Shreeram Lagoo. The music is by Rajesh Roshan.

This is a remake of the Japanese movie High and Low (1963),  directed by Akira Kurosawa, which itself was based on the American novel King's Ransom (1959), by Ed McBain.
Inkaar won national award for best editing.

This was later remade into the Telugu film Dongala Veta (1979).

Plot
Haridas Choudhry lives a wealthy lifestyle in Mumbai, India, along with his wife, Sonu, son, Guddu, and sister, Geeta. He had started his career as a lowly cobbler on a corner of a busy street, but is now the owner of a shoe company. His associates want him to make shoes that wear out soon, but he refuses to do so, and would like to buy out National Shoes for 20 Lakh Rupees. He withdraws the money, but before he could undertake the transaction, Guddu gets kidnapped, and the demand from his abductors is for 20 Lakhs. Much to his relief he finds out that his servant's son, Bansi, has been mistakenly abducted in place of his son. Nevertheless, he decides to pay the ransom, this time with the help of Inspector Amarnath Gill, his sister's estranged boyfriend, who he had turned down as he was not wealthy enough. The money is turned over to the kidnappers, two associates, Manmohan and Preeti, are arrested, Bansi is found and returned to his dad. But the money and the real abductor, Raj Singh, is still at large - and as long as he remains at large none of them can really be safe for he has a grudge to settle against Haridas, and the missing 20 Lakhs may result in the bankruptcy of Haridas' company, they may have to forfeit their family home, and Haridas may well face a jail sentence for embezzling this amount for personal gain. But Inspector catches the thief and returns the money in the end.

Cast 
Vinod Khanna - CID Officer Amarnath "Amar" Gill
Vidya Sinha - Geeta Chaudhry
Shreeram Lagoo - Haridas Chaudhry
Amjad Khan - Raj Singh 'Kidnapper'
Sadhu Meher - Sitaram 'Servant'
M.Rajan - Police Officer Yadav 
Lily Chakravarty - Sonu H. Chaudhry
Bharat Kapoor - Manmohan
Sheetal - Preeti
Ranjita Thakur - Hema Gill
Keshto Mukherjee - Drunk fishing at the china creek
Rakesh Roshan - Himself in a Song "Dil ki Kali Yuhi Sada" (Special Appearance)
Raju Shrestha - Bansi
Kamaldeep - Shoe Company Director 
Harish Magon -  Anil Sharma
Gurbachan Singh -  Bar Room Brawler
Helen - Dancer at Bar in song "O Mungala"
 Brahm Bharadwaj as Judge

Soundtrack 
The music for this film was composed by Rajesh Roshan. The song "O Mungada" was recreated in Total Dhamaal which was picturised on Sonakshi Sinha

References

External links 
 

1978 films
1970s Hindi-language films
1978 crime drama films
1970s mystery drama films
Indian remakes of Japanese films
Indian crime drama films
Indian detective films
Films scored by Rajesh Roshan
Films whose editor won the Best Film Editing National Award
Hindi films remade in other languages
Films directed by Raj N. Sippy